Gordon Noel Parkinson is a retired diplomat of New Zealand.
In 1956 he joined Ministry of Foreign Affairs and Trade (New Zealand), Wellington.
In 1957 he was Vice-Consul, San Francisco.
From 1960 to 1962 he was political officer in the department Asian, Defence fields in the Ministry of Foreign Affairs and Trade (New Zealand).
From 1962 to 1964 he was 2nd Secretary in the mission in Singapore.
From 1964 to 1968 he had a secondment to the Ministry of Defence (New Zealand).
From 1968 to 1971 he had exequatur as consul-general in Bangkok and was New Zealand's charge d' affaires and acting SEATO Council representative.
From 1971 to 1972 he was head of the division responsible for Europe, Americas, Commonwealth affairs in the Ministry of Foreign Affairs and Trade (New Zealand).
From 1972 to 1974 he was head of the administration of the Ministry of Foreign Affairs and Trade (New Zealand).
From 1974 to 1974 he was minister of the embassy in Paris.
From 1978 to 1980 he was ambassador in Lima (Peru) with accreditation in Bogotá (Colombia) and La Paz (Ecuador).
From 1980 to 1982 he was head of the Middle East, African Division in the Ministry of Foreign Affairs and Trade (New Zealand).
In 1982 he was visiting fellow of the Victoria University of Wellington. 
From 1983 to 1986 he was ambassador in Rome (Italy) with accreditation in Riyadh (Saudi Arabia), Cairo (Egypt) and Belgrade (Yugoslavia).
From 1986 to 1990 he was ambassador in Jakarta (Indonesia) .
In 1990 he was director of the Americas Division in the Ministry of Foreign Affairs and Trade (New Zealand).

References

1935 births
Ambassadors of New Zealand to Peru
Ambassadors of New Zealand to Italy
Ambassadors of New Zealand to Indonesia
Living people